Shae is a unisex given name of recent origin, and may refer to:

 John Shae Perring (1813–1869), British engineer
 Shae Bolton (born 1989), Australian netball player
 Shae D'lyn (born 1963), American actress
 Shae Fiol (born 1978), Cuban-American singer-songwriter
 Shae Jones (born 1978), American singer-songwriter
 Shae Lillywhite (born 1985), Australian baseball player
 Shae Marks (born 1972), American adult model
 Shae Simmons (born 1990), American baseball player

See also
 Shea (disambiguation)
 Shaylee (given name)